Chinnamunda is a Buddhist goddess. Her attributes and iconography are similar to those of the Hindu goddess Chhinnamasta. Chinnamunda is often portrayed alongside Mekhala and Kanakhala, the two headless sisters, Indian Buddhist tantric adepts who appear on the list of the 84 Mahasiddhas.

References

Female buddhas and supernatural beings